Mfundo Morrison (born September 5, 1974, in Rome, Georgia) is an American actor,  voice over artist and filmmaker. He portrayed Quartermaine family member Justus Ward on the multi Emmy award-winning hit show General Hospital. He had a reoccurring role on the multi award-winning Closer playing FBI Agent Wayne Horlacher. He has starred in multiple films and theatre productions to critical acclaim.  Morrison was voted General Hospitals sexiest male star, Ebony magazine hottest bachelor. He is also an Emmy nominated voice over artist. He started his own production company and has several projects in development, he also creates content for all media.he was star voice actor in a fiction zombie game “Into The Dead 2” where he starred as Ben from the night of the living dead.

Mfundo Morrison is the great-nephew of Nobel laureate Archbishop Emeritus Desmond Tutu.

Television filmography
General Hospital as Justus Ward #3 (2003–2006)
The Closer as FBI Agent Horlacher (2007)
Laws of Gambling (2005)
Xena: Warrior Princess as Arman (1999)
Young Hercules as Theseus (1999)
Forbidden Island as Culver (1999)

References

External links

1974 births
Living people
African-American male actors
People from Rome, Georgia
American male television actors
American male voice actors
American people of South African descent
American filmmakers
Male actors from Georgia (U.S. state)
Desmond Tutu